Yintian Town is a rural town in Shaoshan City, Xiangtan City, Hunan Province, China.  it had a population of 19,560 and an area of .

Administrative division
The town is divided into eleven villages and a community: Yintianzhen Community, Qingshi Village, South Village, Chayuan Village, Aoshi Village, Fengjia Village, Changtian Village, Nanhu Village, Sanhua Village, Xifeng Village, Beituo Village, and Huaixing Village.

Geography
The Longgu Mountain is a scenic spot in the town, the highest point of the mountain, measures .

Economy
The region abounds with coal, limestone, and sepiolite.

Transportation

Expressway
The Shaoshan Expressway, which runs east through to Nanzhushan Town of Xiangtan County and the west through Qingxi Town to Ningxiang. Its eastern terminus is at G60 Shanghai–Kunming Expressway and its northern terminus is at Changsha-Shaoshan-Loudi Expressway.

Provincial Highway
The S208 Provincial Highway runs through the town.

Railway
The Shaoshan railway, from Xiangshao station of Xiangtan County to Shaoshan station in the town.

Attractions
Yintian Temple, built in 1459, in the third year of the age of Tianshun of Emperor Yingzong, is a Buddhism temple and scenic spot.

References

External links

Divisions of Shaoshan
Towns of Hunan